Afonso Mendes de Melo (1240-1280) 2nd Lord of Melo, was a medieval knight, rico-homem (rich-men) of the Kingdom of Portugal.

He was born in Portugal, the son of Mem Soares de Melo, 1st Lord de Melo and Teresa Afonso Gato, daughter of Afonso Pires Gato and Urraca Fernandes de Lumiares. His wife was Inês Vasques, daughter of Vasco Lourenço da Cunha.

References

External links 
familiamelobanha.no.sapo.pt

1240 births
1280 deaths
13th-century Portuguese people
Portuguese knights
Place of birth unknown
Medieval Portuguese nobility